Celtic Media Group  provides publishing, printing and pre-press (graphic design) services to the Irish newspaper sector. It also has a digital consultancy service.

It is owned by its Irish management team, following a management buy-out led by CEO Frank Mulrennan in 2012.  The group was previously owned by Scottish media firm, Dunfermline Press Group.

Celtic Media has expanded since with the acquisition of the Connaught Telegraph in 2014  and its co-ownership of Dublin People Group, publisher of Northside People & Southside People, acquired in 2018.

It employs a total workforce of 90 staff and has invested significantly in its integrated newspaper publishing system, purchased from the Newscycle company.

The group's publishing titles – among them Meath Chronicle; Anglo Celt; Westmeath Examiner – were the subject of an acquisition bid by INM in late 2016 which was approved by the Competition & Consumer Protection Commission and the Department of Communications.

However, both parties opted not to proceed with the acquisition due to the level of undertakings around employment levels required by the regulatory process.

The print company, operated by Celtic in Navan, was restructured in October 2019 with the loss of 16 jobs and the cessation of its long-standing Trinity Mirror contract.

Two new print contracts have been secured – the Northern Standard newspaper and the Racing Post Weekender title – with the Navan plant now operating on a lower cost base.

The Group won three of the 12 overall awards and received 11 nominations in the latest Local Ireland Media Awards, sponsored by the National Lottery.

In July 2020, the Southside People and Northside People titles were restructured under a new owner. Celtic continues to provide pre-press and print services to the Dublin People titles.   

The print plant has announced the renewal of its contract to print the Racing Post daily newspaper and three weekly titles for the next five years.

Frank Mulrennan, CEO of Celtic and representing the Local Ireland industry body, told the Oireachtas Committee on Media (December 2020) that the country’s 46 weekly local newspapers publish "vital, trusted, and needed public information" but are facing major challenges.  He said: "In reality, our industry is still badly impacted by the last recession and the digital dominance of the likes of Facebook and Google."

Current newspaper titles
The Connaught Telegraph
The Anglo-Celt
Meath Chronicle
Westmeath Examiner
Westmeath Independent

Former Newspaper Assets
Forum. (Meath, free newspaper, publication 'suspended' in 2017).
Offaly Independent(Suspended in March 2020)
Southside People (49.9% stake) (liquidator appointed in May 2020) 
Northside People (49.9% stake) (liquidator appointed in May 2020)

See also
List of Irish newspapers

References

Navan
Newspapers published in the Republic of Ireland